Marian Cristescu (born 17 March 1985) is a Romanian footballer who plays as a midfielder.

Honours
FC Brașov
Romanian Second League: 2007–08

Petrolul Ploiești
Romanian Cup: 2012–13

Astra Giurgiu
Romanian Cup: 2013–14
Romanian Superup: 2014

Corona Brașov
Liga III: 2020–21

References

External links
 
 

1985 births
Living people
Romanian footballers
Association football midfielders
FC Brașov (1936) players
FC Precizia Săcele players
FC Universitatea Cluj players
FC Petrolul Ploiești players
FC Astra Giurgiu players
FC Dinamo București players
CS Concordia Chiajna players
SR Brașov players
CSM Corona Brașov footballers
Liga I players
Liga II players